The Downtown Miami Historic District is a U.S. historic district (designated as such on December 6, 2005) located in the Central Business District of Downtown Miami, Florida.

The district is bounded by Miami Court, North Third Street, West Third Avenue, and South Second Street. It contains 60 historic buildings. A large portion the buildings in the historic district were built during the Florida land boom of the 1920s, when Miami experienced rapid population growth. Many of the older structures from before the 1920s, were smaller scale buildings and homes from the Miami pioneer era of the mid and late-19th century. Palm Cottage, built in 1897 is a home from the pioneer era that is still standing, however, few of these original homes remain.

Gallery

See also
Greater Downtown Miami
Lummus Park Historic District
National Register of Historic Places listings in Miami, Florida
Downtown Miami Multiple Resource Area

References

External links

 Dade County listings at National Register of Historic Places

National Register of Historic Places in Miami
Historic districts on the National Register of Historic Places in Florida
2005 establishments in Florida